The Dream Tour was the thirteenth headlining concert tour by Japanese-American singer-songwriter Ai and was in support of her twelfth studio album, Dream (2022). The tour began on May 14, 2022, in Koshigaya, Japan and concluded on December 9, 2022, in Tokyo, Japan.

Background 
On November 1, 2022, Ai performed her final show of the It's All Me Tour at the Tokyo International Forum. On that same day, her single "Aldebaran" was released digitally, which became a moderate success in Japan. In December 2021, Ai announced the tour with limited pre-order tickets for her fan club members through January 10, 2022. A few days later, she announced her twelfth studio album, Dream. Auditions for background dancers were held from December 17 to January 3, 2022.

The tour initially was set to conclude on October 22, 2022. Additional performance dates were added for September 30, October 8 and November 4 and 6. A final tour performance was added for December 9. Choreography was handled by Riehata, Luther Brown and Elysandra Quinones.

Concert synopsis 
The show featured a series of special lighting effects and four dancers. Reviewers at Barks noted the highlights of the tour were "definitely the dancing". The opening number of the performance was "Not So Different". While performing "Last Words", Ai commented on the age of the song. During the performance of "Soul Train", the costumes and stage are set in a style of the 1970's. During the second half, Ai performs her English songs, including "Moriagaro" and "Let It Go". The performance closed with "We Have a Dream" from Ai's twelfth studio album, Dream. Encore performances included "Aldebaran" and "Happiness".

Setlist 
{{hidden|header=Setlist|content=This set list is representative of the show on June 5, 2022 in Matsudo. It is not intended to represent all concerts for the tour.
 "Not So Different"
 "Last Words"
 "Independent Woman"
 "Story"
 "Dear Mama"
 "Dear Papa"
 "Soul Train"
 "Moriagaro"
 "Welcome to My City"
 "Let It Go"
 "We Have a Dream"
Encore
 "Aldebaran"
 "365" 
 "Happiness"|headercss=background: #ccccff; font-size: 100%; width: 100%;|contentcss=text-align: left; font-size: 100%; width: 100%;}}

Tour dates 
Tour dates for the Dream Tour.

References 

2022 concert tours
Concert tours of Japan
Ai (singer) concert tours